Pasta is a staple food of traditional Italian cuisine, with the first reference dating to 1154 in Sicily. It is also commonly used to refer to the variety of pasta dishes. Pasta is typically a noodle traditionally made from an unleavened dough of durum wheat flour mixed with water and formed into sheets and cut, or extruded into various shapes, then cooked and served in a number of dishes. It can be made with flour from other cereals or grains, and eggs may be used instead of water.

Each traditional pasta dish is defined by a specific kind of pasta, a specific cooking style, and a specific sauce or condiment. There are large number of evolutions and variants of the traditional dishes. Pasta is also often used as a complementary ingredient in some soups, but these are not considered "pasta dishes" (except for the category pasta in brodo or 'pasta in broth').

The various kinds of pasta are categorized as: pasta secca (dried pasta), pasta fresca (fresh pasta), pasta all’uovo (egg pasta), pasta ripiena (filled pasta or stuffed pasta, like ravioli), gnocchi (soft dough dumplings). The cooking styles are categorized in: pasta asciutta (or pastasciutta, in which the pasta is boiled and then dressed with a complementary sauce or condiment), pasta al forno (baked pasta, in which the pasta is incorporated into a dish, along with the sauce or condiment and subsequently baked), and pasta in brodo (pasta in broth, in which the pasta is cooked and served in a broth, usually made of meat). Pasta sauces (mostly used for pasta asciutta and pasta al forno) are categorized into two broad groups: sughi rossi (red sauces, with tomatoes) and sughi bianchi (white sauces, without tomatoes).

Italy

Other countries

Commercially-prepared dishes

See also
 List of noodle dishes
 List of pasta
 List of sauces – sauces are often used in the preparation of pasta dishes

Notes

References

Bibliography
 (first edition: 1930).

External links
National Museum of Pasta Foods – Rome, Italy

 

 List
Lists of foods by type